Kyaw Myint (born 22 January 1940) is a Burmese physician and former Minister of Health. He previously served as a member of parliament in the House of Representatives for Chanayethazan Township constituency. He has served as the personal physician of Than Shwe, the country's former head of state.

References

20th-century Burmese physicians
1940 births
Members of Pyithu Hluttaw
Living people
Union Solidarity and Development Party politicians
University of Medicine 1, Yangon alumni
Health ministers of Myanmar
Specially Designated Nationals and Blocked Persons List
Individuals related to Myanmar sanctions